Steven G. Clarke, (born November 19, 1949) an American biochemist, is a director of the UCLA Molecular Biology Institute, a professor of chemistry and biochemistry at UCLA biochemistry department. Clarke heads a laboratory at UCLA's department of chemistry and biochemistry. Clarke is famous for his work on molecular damage and discoveries of novel molecular repair mechanisms.

Clarke has been on the faculty of the UCLA Department of Chemistry and Biochemistry since 1978. He is currently a Professor of Biochemistry and Director of the UCLA Molecular Biology Institute.

Early life and education 
He was born in Los Angeles and attended public schools in Altadena and Pasadena, California. 

He did his undergraduate work at Pomona College, a private institution, in Claremont, majoring in Chemistry and Zoology and graduating in 1970. During this time, he did undergraduate research at the UCLA Brain Research Institute with James E. Skinner and Professor Donald B. Lindsley on neural mechanisms of attention. He was also an NIH fellow in the laboratory of Peter Mitchell at Glynn Research Laboratories in Bodmin, England studying mitochondrial amino acid transport. 

He obtained a PhD in Biochemistry and Molecular Biology from Harvard University working as an NSF Fellow with Professor Guido Guidotti on membrane protein-detergent interactions and the identification of the major rat liver mitochondrial polypeptides as enzymes of the urea cycle. He returned to California to do postdoctoral work as a Miller Fellow at the University of California, Berkeley, with Professor Daniel Koshland, identifying membrane receptors for bacterial chemotaxis.

Career 
Clarke's research at UCLA has focused on roles of novel protein methyltransferases in aging and biological regulation highlighted by discoveries of the protein repair L-isoaspartyl methyltransferase, the isoprenylcysteine protein methyltransferase, and the protein phosphatase 2A methyltransferase.

He was a visiting scholar at Princeton University (1986–87) and at the University of Washington (2004-2005).

Clarke has conducted research on the biochemistry of brains and Alzheimer's disease since 1990.

References

External links
 UCLA Personnel Portal
 Dr. Clarke, Department of Chemistry and Biochemistry, UCLA
 

Living people
American biochemists
Princeton University faculty
University of Washington faculty
Harvard Graduate School of Arts and Sciences alumni
University of California, Los Angeles faculty
University of California, Berkeley fellows
1949 births
Pomona College alumni